The Halifax Comedy Festival (often spelled in promotional materials as Ha!ifax Comedy Festival) is an annual comedy festival held in Halifax, Nova Scotia, Canada. The festival is sponsored by the CBC which tapes and broadcasts the comedians' sets as a series of television specials, and is usually about one week long. Shows frequently take place at the Halifax Casino in The Schooner Showroom among other venues.

Live tapings of CBC Radio's hit show The Debaters have become a part of the annual festival, frequently using comedians who are performing in the festival as the 'debaters'.

Past performers include
Irwin Barker
Ryan Belleville
Mark Critch (frequently hosts)
Debra DiGiovanni
Cynthia Dunsford
Derek Edwards
Glen Foster
Kevin Foxx
Stewart Francis
Doug Funk
Cathy Jones
Barry Julien
Paul Myrehaug
Gilson Lubin
Mike MacDonald
Darcy Michael
Tim Nutt
Steve Patterson
Kevin Pollak
Ron Sparks
Winston Spear
Tim Steeves
Pete Zedlacher
MJ Miller

References

Comedy festivals in Canada
Festivals in Halifax, Nova Scotia
CTV Comedy Channel original programming
CBC Television original programming
Canadian stand-up comedy television series